Bernd Uhlig (born 7 August 1942) is a German fencer. He competed for East Germany at the 1968 and 1972 Summer Olympics.

References

External links
 

1942 births
Living people
German male fencers
Olympic fencers of East Germany
Fencers at the 1968 Summer Olympics
Fencers at the 1972 Summer Olympics
Sportspeople from Mecklenburg-Western Pomerania